Simon Abramovich Osiashvili (born December 4, 1952, Lviv) is a  Russian poet, singer, Honoured Artist of Russia (2002).

Since 1986 to the present time the songs of Simon Osiashvili year are unchanged winners of the TV Festival Pesnya goda. Songwriter for Igor Sarukhanov, Philipp Kirkorov, Vyacheslav Malezhik, Mikhail Boyarsky, Valentina Legkostupova, Yaroslav Yevdokimov, Irina Ponarovskaya and many others.

Member of the professional Russian jury at Eurovision Song Contest 2019.

References

External links
 Official site

1952 births
Living people
Russian male poets
Russian poets of Ukrainian descent
Soviet poets
Soviet male writers
20th-century Russian male writers
Honored Artists of the Russian Federation
Russian people of Jewish descent
Russian songwriters
Russian lyricists
Lviv Polytechnic alumni
Musicians from Lviv
Maxim Gorky Literature Institute alumni